Lott is a surname and given name.

Lott or LOTT or similar, may also refer to:

Places
 Lott, Texas, USA; a city in Falls County
 Rosebud-Lott Independent School District, Travis, Falls County, Texas, USA
 Rosebud-Lott High School, Travis, Falls County, Texas, USA
 Dell Lott Hollow, Fishlake National Forest, Pavant Range, Sevier County, Utah, USA
 Trent Lott International Airport, Moss Point, Mississippi, USA
 Lott Cemetery, Waycross, Georgia, USA
 Howard L. and Vivian W. Lott House, Mineola, Wood County, Texas, USA
 Hendrick I. Lott House, Marine Park, Brooklyn, New York City, New York State, USA
 Willy Lott's Cottage, Flatford, East Bergholt, Suffolk, England, UK

Other uses
 Law of total tricks (LoTT) in contract bridge
 The Lott, Australian lottery brand
 Lott Trophy, college football trophy
 Trent Lott Center for Economic Development, University of Southern Mississippi
 Libs of TikTok, far-right anti-LGBT Twitter account

See also

 .458 Lott rifle cartridge
 Bounds Lott, Wicomico County, Maryland, USA
 Hayward's Lott (Ivy Hall), Pocomoke City, Somerset County, Maryland, USA
 
 
Lotta (disambiguation)
Lotts (disambiguation)
Lotty (name)
Lotti (name)
 Lottie (disambiguation)
 Lotte (disambiguation)
 Lot (disambiguation)